Ervin Lee Inniger, Jr. (born January 16, 1945) is a retired professional basketball shooting guard who spent two seasons in the American Basketball Association (ABA) as a member of the Minnesota Muskies (1967–68) and the Miami Floridians (1968–69). After his two seasons in the ABA, he moved back to Minnesota and accepted the job as athletic director and men's basketball coach for Golden Valley Lutheran College. He coached five years at Augsburg College before accepting the head coach position at North Dakota State University. Since 2013, Inniger has been the head boys' basketball coach for Park Christian High School in Moorhead, Minnesota.

References

External links

1945 births
Living people
American men's basketball players
Augsburg Auggies men's basketball coaches
Basketball coaches from Indiana
Basketball players from Indiana
College men's basketball head coaches in the United States
High school basketball coaches in Minnesota
Indiana Hoosiers men's basketball players
Miami Floridians players
Minnesota Muskies players
North Dakota State Bison men's basketball coaches
People from Berne, Indiana
Shooting guards